Scarlet is an unincorporated community in Northwest Township, Orange County, in the U.S. state of Indiana.

History
A post office was established at Scarlet in 1898, and remained in operation until it was discontinued in 1915. Otho C. Scarlet served as an early postmaster.

Geography

References

Unincorporated communities in Orange County, Indiana
Unincorporated communities in Indiana